William Gordon East (also W. G. East; 19 November 1902 – 27 January 1998) was an English geographer and writer. He studied at Cambridge University. He taught at the London School of Economics and Political Science.

His work includes the following books:

 The Union of Moldavia and Wallachia, 1859: An Episode in Diplomatic History
 The Geography behind History
 The Changing Map of Asia: A Political Geography
 An Historical Geography of Europe; 1st to 4th eds. Methuen, 1935, 1943, 1948, 1950 
 The Soviet Union
 Our Fragmented World: An Introduction to Political Geography
 The Spirit and Purpose of Geography

For his essay on The Union of Moldavia and Wallachia, 1859: An Episode in Diplomatic History, he was awarded the Thirlwall Prize for 1927.

Footnotes

Further reading

External links
Find books written by William Gorden East on Alibris

1902 births
1998 deaths
English geographers
English non-fiction writers
English male non-fiction writers
Historical geographers
Political geographers
20th-century English male writers